Henry Martineau (ne Schwab; 20 July 1904 – 23 January 1972) was a British bobsledder. He competed in the four-man event at the 1928 Winter Olympics.

He attended Eton College and Trinity College, Cambridge. His stepfather was Hubert Martineau.

He married twice.  In 1930 he married Constance Rosa Watney at St George's Hanover Square, London.  They lived at Itchel Manor, Hartley Wintney, Hampshire.  Constance died on 14 February 1963 at Hotel Jzum, Storchen, Zurich, Switzerland.

References

External links
 

1904 births
1972 deaths
British male bobsledders
Olympic bobsledders of Great Britain
Bobsledders at the 1928 Winter Olympics
Bobsledders from Chicago
People educated at Eton College
Alumni of Trinity College, Cambridge